Downtown station may refer to:
Azusa Downtown station, a station on the Gold Line of the Los Angeles Metro Rail of Los Angeles, California
Downtown station (Capital MetroRail), a station on the Capital MetroRail of Austin, Texas
Downtown station (HART), a planned light rail station in Honolulu, Hawaii
Downtown Crossing station, a station served by the Red, Orange, and Silver lines of the Metropolitan Boston Transportation Agency in Boston, Massachusetts
Downtown MRT station, a station on the Downtown MRT line of the Mass Rapid Transit system in Singapore